The 2017 Challenger Banque Nationale de Granby was a professional tennis tournament played on outdoor hard courts. It was the 24th edition, for men, and 7th edition, for women, of the tournament and part of the 2017 ATP Challenger Tour and the 2017 ITF Women's Circuit, offering totals of $100,000, for men, and $60,000, for women, in prize money. It took take place in Granby, Quebec, Canada between July 24 and 30, 2017.

Men's singles main-draw entrants

Seeds

1 Rankings are as of July 17, 2017

Other entrants
The following players received wildcards into the singles main draw:
 Philip Bester
 Frank Dancevic
 Filip Peliwo
 Benjamin Sigouin

The following player received entry into the singles main draw with a protected ranking:
 Alejandro González

The following player received entry into the singles main draw as an alternate:
 Mikael Torpegaard

The following players received entry from the qualifying draw:
 Liam Broady
 Marinko Matosevic
 Bradley Mousley
 Kaichi Uchida

Women's singles main-draw entrants

Seeds

1 Rankings are as of July 17, 2017

Other entrants
The following players received wildcards into the singles main draw:
 Carson Branstine
 Ellen Perez
 Charlotte Robillard-Millette
 Carol Zhao

The following player entered the singles main draw with a protected ranking:
 Kimberly Birrell

The following players received entry from the qualifying draw:
 Jessica Failla
 Alexa Guarachi
 Jessika Ponchet
 Chanelle Van Nguyen

The following player received entry as a lucky loser:
 Elena Bovina

Champions

Men's singles

 Blaž Kavčič def.  Peter Polansky, 6–3, 2–6, 7–5

Women's singles

 Cristiana Ferrando def.  Katherine Sebov, 6–2, 6–3

Men's doubles

 Joe Salisbury /  Jackson Withrow def.  Marcel Felder /  Go Soeda,  4–6, 6–3, [10–6]

Women's doubles

 Ellen Perez /  Carol Zhao def.  Alexa Guarachi /  Olivia Tjandramulia, 6–2, 6–2

External links
Official website

Challenger Banque Nationale de Granby
Challenger Banque Nationale de Granby
Challenger de Granby
Challenger Banque Nationale de Granby